Out of the Ruins is a choral work by Michael Nyman for an eponymous BBC documentary by Agnieszka Piotrowska in commemorating the first anniversary of the 1988 Spitak earthquake in Armenia 7 December 1988, which aired on the BBC's 40 Minutes.  The texts are from Grigor Narekatsi's Book of Lamentations.  It was conducted by Khoren Meykhnanejian.

The album, Nyman's fourteenth, was the first release by Nyman on which he did not perform but did produce,  was released by Silva Screen Records and all proceeds from the sale of the album were donated to Aid Armenia.  The music became the basis of Nyman's String Quartet No. 3, which in turn became the basis of the score for Carrington.  It also appeared in part in À la folie, in unreleased music from Practical Magic, and in The End of the Affair and The Claim.

Personnel
Performed by the Holy Echmiadzin Chorus
Conducted by Khoren Meykhanejian
40 Minutes Editor: Caroline Pick
Location Sound Recordist: David Briscome (BBC TV)
Post Production: PRT Studios, London
Engineer: Michael J. Dutton
Produced by David Cunningham and Michael Nyman
Special thanks to Ian Amos and George Kurkjian, OBE
Executive Producer for Silva Screen Records Ltd: Reynold Da Silva
CD Release Supervision: David Stoner and James Fitzpatrick
Photographs: Agniezka Piotrowska
Cover graphic design: Iain Macdonald
CD layout:  The One Hand Clapping Company
Translation and transliteration of choral text: Mark Sarafyan

References

External links
 DVD Out of the Ruins

1989 soundtrack albums
Television soundtracks
Silva Screen Records soundtracks
Michael Nyman soundtracks